or  (1569 –  June 4, 1615) was a prominently placed figure in the late-Sengoku period.  She was the daughter of Oichi and sister of Ohatsu and Oeyo. She was a concubine and second wife of Toyotomi Hideyoshi, who was then the most powerful man in Japan. She also became the mother of his son and successor, Hideyori. Her time period being that of large turmoil and overhaul, Yodo-dono had an interest toward both politics and administration. She actively acted in the restoration of the Toyotomi clan after the fall of the Council of Five Elders, as Hideyori's guardian. Alongside her son, Yodo-dono led the last anti-Tokugawa shogunate resistance in the siege of Osaka.

When her two younger sisters became prominent members linked to the Tokugawa clan, Oichi's three daughters were vital to maintaining a diplomatic relationship between the two most powerful clans of the time, Toyotomi and Tokugawa. Her sister, Oeyo, was the wife of the second shogun, Tokugawa Hidetada, and matriarch of the successive shoguns' lineage, thus receiving the political title Omidaidokoro.

The relationship of Tokugawa and Toyotomi has been falling steadily since Hideyoshi's death, so it led both clans to the Battle of Sekigahara and later to the siege of Osaka. Due to the attempt to exalt the Tokugawa Shogunate, Yodo-dono was frequently portrayed as a "wicked and wanton" woman who planned the Toyotomis' death. She was also known as Lady Chacha (茶々). After the death of Hideyoshi, she took the tonsure, becoming a Buddhist nun and taking the name Daikōin (大広院).  She was the founder of the temple Yogen-in (養源院).

The great wealth and changing fortunes of her family affected Yodo-dono's life as well.  Surviving record books from luxury goods merchants provide insight into patterns of patronage and taste amongst the privileged class of women like Yodo-dono and her sisters.

Genealogy
Yodo-dono, also called  in her youth, was the eldest of three daughters of the Sengoku period daimyō Azai Nagamasa. Her mother, Oichi was the younger sister of Oda Nobunaga.

After Nagamasa's death, Toyotomi Hideyoshi became the adoptive father and protector of Chacha. Her status changed once when she became his concubine, and once again when she became the mother of his heir.

Lady Okurakyo no tsubone (Ono Harunaga's mother), Lady Aeba no tsubone (the second daughter of her grandaunt, Kaitsu-dono), and Otsubone (a wife of Sawaki Yoshiyuki and brother of Maeda Toshiie) were Chacha's wet nurses (foster mother).

Yodo-dono's middle sister, Ohatsu, was the wife of Kyōgoku Takatsugu and the mother of Kyōgoku Tadataka.

Yodo-dono's youngest sister, Oeyo, also known as Ogō, was the principal wife of Shōgun Tokugawa Hidetada and the mother of his successor Tokugawa Iemitsu.

Early years
In 1570, Chacha's father, Nagamasa, broke his alliance with Oda Nobunaga and there was a three-year period of fighting until 1573 when Nobunaga's army surrounded Nagamasa at Odani Castle. Nobunaga, however, requested the safe return of his sister, Oichi. Chacha, along with her mother and her two sisters, left the castle with her. Odani castle fell, and amongst those who died were Nagamasa and Manpukumaru, Chacha's only brother.

Nobunaga's death in 1582 caused open hostilities between Shibata Katsuie and Hashiba Hideyoshi over the issue of succession. Katsuie's forces were defeated at the Battle of Shizugatake, and he was forced retreat to Kitanosho castle. With Hideyoshi's army laying siege to his home, Katsuie set the castle ablaze; he and Oichi perished in it.

However, before Oichi died, she passed Chacha, Oeyo, and Ohatsu to the care and protection of Hideyoshi. She was skilled with Waka poetry and was regarded as the highest ranked princess of the Azai family. She treated her sisters and other relatives well though it is said that she was also a passionate speaker regarding the Toyotomi's future.

Concubine of Hideyoshi

In 1588, Yodogimi became pregnant.  Hideyoshi, who did not yet have a son, was greatly pleased. Hideyoshi's younger brother Toyotomi Hidenaga remodeled the Yodo castle in March 1589. After this, Hideyoshi gave Yodo castle to Chacha, probably to appeal the existence of his son to the retainers who passes between Osaka and Kyoto city. Hideyoshi's wife, Nene, was said to have been unable to conceive; and thus Lady Yodo inherited many of her privileges. She had two sons with Hideyoshi, Tsurumatsu, who died young, and Hideyori, born in 1593, who became Hideyoshi's designated successor. Tsurumatsu died in 1591, but after her giving birth to Hideyori, she gave the important posts, guardians of Hideyori, to Okurakyo no Tsubone and Aeba no Tsubone.

In 1594, the family moved to Fushimi Castle, but tragedy fell when Hideyoshi died in 1598.  As a result, the Toyotomi clan lost much of its influence and importance. Yodo-dono founded the temple Yogen-in,(養源院) in memory of her father Azai Nagamasa and her mother Oichi, and she contributed to the restoration of temples in Koya-san Mountain and others. Yodo-dono then moved to Osaka Castle with her son Hideyori and plotted the restoration of the Toyotomi clan. She intervened in politics as Hideyori's guardian and became the de facto head of Osaka Castle.

Struggles against Tokugawa Clan

Sekigahara Campaign (1600) 

After the death of Hideyoshi in 1598, Hideyori became the successor of Hideyoshi and Chacha became the mother of paramount. But Hideyori still was a child and could not manage the retainer, and conflict of front generals and administrative staff became serious. Tokugawa Ieyasu who was the largest lord under Toyotomi government aimed at next hegemony, stirred up the conflict of both party and supported front generals.

Ishida Mitsunari (1560-1600), the chief administrative staff of Toyotomi government, raised his army to stop the ambition of Ieyasu, but was defeated at the Battle of Sekigahara and was executed. After the defeat of the Western Army, the Toyotomi clan lost much of its sovereignty, even though Yodo-dono did not actively participate in the Battle of Sekigahara it is said that more than 2,000 Toyotomi vassals participated in the battle and relations between Tokugawa-Toyotomi declined.

Ieyasu distributes the Toyotomi family area as a prize for the Sekigahara, and the Toyotomi family will have less control. As Hideyori's guardian, Yodo-dono has the leadership of Osaka Castle, after Ieyasu ends the Council of Five elders. After the Battle of Sekigahara, she confronted Ieyasu who started to construct a military government in Edo, and refused his requirement for Hideyori to show his vassalage and go to the capital, Kyoto City.

Formation of the Tokugawa Shogunate 
In 1603, Tokugawa Ieyasu was named as Shogun by the emperor, Yodo-dono began to actively resist the Tokugawa. Hideyori still kept Osaka castle and married with Princess Senhime, the daughter of Tokugawa Hidetada who was the son of Ieyasu, there was no room for two rulers. Even though having secured the Osaka castle and inherited huge amount of property from Hideyoshi, former retainers of Hideyori now supported Edo Shogunate and Hideyori’s position became quite weak. But Yodo-dono was proud of her blood, and also her status as a mother of paramount. It is said that at first Ieyasu tried to conciliate Yodo-dono and Hideyori to become subordinates to Ieyasu, but she declined.

In 1611, Hideyori finally left Osaka, meeting with Ieyasu for two hours at Nijō Castle. Ieyasu was surprised by Hideyori's behavior, contrary to popular belief that the boy was just "useless". This belief had been spread by Katagiri Katsumoto, Hideyori's personal guardian since 1599 assigned by Ieyasu, and who had the intention of dissuading any aggression against the heir.

Incident of Hoko-ji Bell 
In 1614, the Toyotomi clan rebuilt Osaka Castle. At the same time, the head of the clan sponsored the rebuilding of Hōkō-ji in Kyoto. These temple renovations included the casting of a great bronze bell, with inscriptions that read "May the state be peaceful and prosperous" (国家安康 kokka ankō), and "May noble lord and servants be rich and cheerful" (君臣豊楽 kunshin hōraku). The shogunate interpreted "kokka ankō" (国家安康) as shattering Ieyasu's name (家康) to curse him, and also interpreted "kunshin hōraku" (君臣豊楽) to mean "Toyotomi's force (豊臣) will rise again," which meant treachery against the shogunate. Tensions began to grow between the Tokugawa and the Toyotomi clans, and only increased when Toyotomi  began to gather a force of rōnin and enemies of the shogunate in Osaka. Ieyasu, despite having passed the title of Shōgun to his son in 1605, nevertheless maintained significant influence.

After the Hoko-ji Temple Bell Incident, Yodo-dono sent Lady Okurakyo, Lady Aeba and Katagiri Katsumoto to Sunpu to see Tokugawa Ieyasu. In this meeting, Ieyasu hatched a plot to induce a split among the people of the Toyotomi family. On one hand, Ieyasu proposed, humbly, a generous demand towards Lady Okurakyo. On the other hand, Ieyasu made severe demands on Katagiri Katsumoto, who represented the moderates and had been separately asking Ieyasu to save the Toyotomi family.

Katagiri Katsumoto overthrow 
Despite Katagiri Katsumoto's attempts to mediate the situation, Ieyasu found the ideal pretext to take a belligerent attitude against Yodo-dono and Hideyori. The situation worsened in September of that year, when the news reached Edo that in Osaka a large quantity of rōnin were grouping at the invitation of Hideyori. Katsumoto proposed to Yodo-dono that she be sent to Edo as a hostage with the desire to avoid hostilities, to which she flatly refused. Suspecting him of trying to betray the Toyotomi clan, Yodo-dono finally banished Katsumoto and several other servants accused of treason from Osaka castle. Following their banishment they entered the service of the Tokugawa clan and any possibility of reaching an agreement with the shogunate was dissolved.

The reason why Yodo-dono banished Katsumoto and Oda Urakusai who struggled to avoid a war as they knew the fight against Tokugawa meant the fall of the Toyotomi family, and furthermore refused the reconciliation scheme proposed by the Tokugawa side, has been attributed to her pride and obstinacy, but nowadays, we see such an explanation that although Yodo-dono accepted to become a hostage, the supreme commander Hideyori hated and denied the offer.

This last movement of Yodo-dono, who acted as the guardian of Hideyori, led to the beginning of the siege of Osaka.

Siege of Osaka 

Tokugawa Ieyasu, who seized control from Hideyori after the death of Hideyoshi, now viewed Hideyori as an obstacle to his unification of Japan. In 1614, Ieyasu laid siege to Osaka Castle. Yodo-dono defended the castle alongside her son, she actively participated in the siege. When the Tokugawa army bombarded her room killing two of her maids, Yodo-Dono went with three or four armed women dressed in armor and told the warriors to make a peace treaty. She met with Lady Acha which was accompanied by Honda Masazumi and Ohatsu (Yodo-dono younger sister), the treaty was accepted by both sides.

However, in 1615, Ieyasu broke the truce and once again attacked Osaka Castle. Subsequently, Yodo-dono and her son Hideyori committed suicide in the flames of Osaka castle, ending the Toyotomi legacy.

Family
 Father: Azai Nagamasa (1545-1573)
 Mother: Oichi (1547-1583)
 Adopted mother: Nene (d. 1624)
 Husband: Toyotomi Hideyoshi (1537-1598) (Hideyoshi also is her adopted father)
 Sons:
 Toyotomi Tsurumatsu (1589–1591)
 Toyotomi Hideyori (1593-1615)
 Adopted Daughter:
 Toyotomi Sadako (1592–1658), daughter of Oeyo later married Kujō Yukiie

Cultural references

A fictional character based on Yodo-dono appears in James Clavell's Shōgun. This contrived protagonist is Lady Ochiba, who dislikes Toranaga (Tokugawa Ieyasu) because he presumably suspected her son was not fathered by the Taikō (Toyotomi Hideyoshi). However, she admires and trusts the Taikō's widow, Yodoko (Nene), who urges both her and Toranaga to marry so that Japan would remain united, and when the heir, Yaemon (Toyotomi Hideyori) comes of age, he can safely take control.  In James Clavell's later novels it is revealed that, just as in real history, Toranaga eventually besieged Ochiba and Yaemon in their castle, prompting them to commit suicide.

In the 2009 film Goemon (五右衛門), Cha-Cha is portrayed by Ryōko Hirosue, and is depicted as being in love with Ishikawa Goemon (the equivalent of Robin Hood or Ned Kelly).  She is eventually forced to marry Hideyoshi, though Goemon attempts to save Cha-Cha to no avail, dying in the attempt.

In the 2011 Taiga drama, Gō: Hime-tachi no Sengoku, Cha-cha was portrayed by Japanese actress Rie Miyazawa.  In the drama series Nobunaga no Chef (2013) – Episode 5, Chacha makes her appearance as a child by her parents' side. A great part of this episode revolves around her and the fact that she would not eat meat. Out of her mother's concern, the main character of this series is asked (or rather forced, else he would face death) to make a dish that will make Chacha like meat. She eternized in the book ''The Yodo Castle''

In Kamen Rider × Kamen Rider Gaim & Wizard: The Fateful Sengoku Movie Battle, Cha-Cha (portrayed by Hikaru Yamamoto) appears in Gaim's portion of the film, in the World of the Sengoku Period.

Among video games, she appears in Capcom's most recent addition of the Onimusha series, Onimusha: Dawn of Dreams, as Toyotomi Hideyoshi's concubine and sister to playable character Ohatsu, who affectionately calls Yodo by her childhood name, "Cha-Cha". She also appears as a playable character in Samurai Warriors: Sanada Maru. She also appears under the name Chacha, a Berserker-class Servant in Fate/Grand Order. Yodo-dono also appears as a main antagonist and final boss in Nioh'''s final DLC Bloodshed's End.

In board games, she appears as one of the characters of the expansion Rising Sun of the card game Samurai Sword by Emiliano Sciarra.

In the video game Nioh, she appears as the main antagonist in the third DLC, Bloodshed's End''. She acts to oppose Tokugawa Ieyasu's rule and supports her son's claim to the position of shōgun, Toyotomi Hideyori. It is later revealed that Hideyori is a homunculus due to being stillborn but later revived using the Spirit Stones and that Yodo-dono is actually possessed by the evil yōkai, Tamamo no Mae. Her guardian spirit is a benevolent nine-tailed fox.

See also 
 List of female castellans in Japan
 Onna-musha

References

Bibliography
 Hickman, Money L., John T. Carpenter and Bruce A. Coats. (2002).  Japan's Golden Age: Momoyama. New Haven: Yale University Press. ; OCLC 34564921

External links 
 Sengoku Expo: biography

1560s births
1615 deaths
16th-century Japanese women
17th-century Japanese women
Samurai
16th-century Japanese people
People of Muromachi-period Japan
People of Azuchi–Momoyama-period Japan
People of Edo-period Japan
Japanese concubines
17th-century Japanese people
Japanese Buddhist clergy
Suicides by sharp instrument in Japan
Japanese women in warfare
16th-century women rulers
Women in 17th-century warfare
Deified Japanese people
Azai clan